The National Time Service Center (NTSC) has the task of generating, maintaining and broadcasting standard time in China. It is located in Xi'an, Shaanxi, China. Its predecessor was the Shaanxi Astronomy Observatory of the Chinese Academy of Sciences, which was established in 1966. In March 2001, the Observatory was renamed to National Time Service Center of the Chinese Academy of Sciences.

NTSC includes short-wave (BPM) and long-wave (BPL) standard time and frequency radio stations. And in 2007, low-frequency (BPC) time signal station began trial broadcasting from Shangqiu.

References

Research institutes of the Chinese Academy of Sciences
1966 establishments in China
Education in Xi'an
Time in China

Time signals